Alan Morgan (born 2 November 1973) is a Welsh former professional footballer and Wales under-21 international. He moved into club management after his playing career, with Welsh Premier League side Aberystwyth Town.

Playing career
Morgan began his career at Tranmere Rovers, making his debut on 27 August 1996 in a 2–0 victory over Port Vale before spending time on loan at Conference National side Altrincham. The following season, Morgan began to establish himself in the first team at Prenton Park, making 23 appearances in all competitions. Rovers fought their way to the 2000 League Cup Final and with Morgan as an unused substitute, they were defeated 2–1 by Leicester City. However continuing injury problems restricted his first team appearances in the following years and, in 2002, he was allowed to join Doncaster Rovers on a free transfer.

He played just three times for Doncaster before being released and instead moved to Morecambe in December 2002. After a spell with Porthmadog, Morgan took over as player-manager of Welsh Premier League side NEWI Cefn Druids, replacing Steve O'Shaughnessy in February 2004. However, he spent just 10 months in the role before stepping down in December 2004 and moving to Rhyl, where he made one appearance before ending his first team playing career at Connah's Quay Nomads.

Managerial career
In 2007, Morgan joined Bangor City as assistant manager to former Tranmere player Neville Powell where they led the side to two consecutive top six finishes and UEFA Cup places.

Aberystwyth Town
Morgan was appointed as manager of his home town team Aberystwyth Town in November 2009, succeeding Brian Coyne. Morgan was joined by his former Tranmere and Wales under-21 teammate Christian Edwards, who had served as caretaker manager of the club during the vacancy, as his assistant manager. In his first season, Morgan took Aberystwyth to a fourth-placed finish.

He left the club in February 2012 by mutual consent after a disappointing season.

Llandudno
In November 2012, Morgan was appointed manager of Llandudno. Following his appointment he was named Cymru Alliance Manager of the Month. Morgan lead Llandudno to promotion to the Welsh Premier League for the first time in the club's existence after winning the 2014–15 Cymru Alliance. He parted company with the club on 23 October 2017 after five years in charge.

Colwyn Bay
In November 2017 Morgan was appointed manager of Colwyn Bay.

Marine
In September 2018 Morgan was appointed assistant manager of Marine.

Honours

As a manager
Llanduno
Cymru Alliance
Winners 2014–15

Individual
Welsh Premier League Manager of the Month: November 2015, March 2010

References

External links
 
 Welsh Premier profile#

1973 births
Living people
Welsh footballers
Welsh football managers
Wales under-21 international footballers
Tranmere Rovers F.C. players
Altrincham F.C. players
Doncaster Rovers F.C. players
Morecambe F.C. players
Rhyl F.C. players
Aberystwyth Town F.C. players
English Football League players
National League (English football) players
Cymru Premier players
Cymru Premier managers
Aberystwyth Town F.C. managers
Cefn Druids A.F.C. managers
Cefn Druids A.F.C. players
Llandudno F.C. managers
Colwyn Bay F.C. managers
Association football midfielders
Bangor City F.C. players
Tranmere Rovers F.C. non-playing staff
Marine F.C. non-playing staff